The 1993 NCAA Division II Lacrosse Championship was the ninth annual tournament to determine the national champions of NCAA Division II men's college lacrosse in the United States, although the first incarnation of a separate Division II tournament since 1981. 

The final, and only match of the tournament, was played at C.W. Post Stadium at C.W. Post College in Brookville, New York. 

Adelphi defeated hosts C.W. Post, 11–7, to claim the Panthers' third Division II national title.

Bracket

See also
1993 NCAA Division I Men's Lacrosse Championship
1993 NCAA Division I Women's Lacrosse Championship
1993 NCAA Division III Men's Lacrosse Championship

References

NCAA Division II Men's Lacrosse Championship
NCAA Division II Men's Lacrosse Championship
NCAA Division II Men's Lacrosse